Aliciella triodon (formerly Gilia triodon) is a species of flowering plant in the phlox family known by the common name coyote gilia. It is native to the American desert southwest from California to New Mexico, where it grows in desert habitat such as scrub and woodland. This small herb produces a thin, glandular stem not more than about 13 centimeters tall. The stem is surrounded by a basal rosette of fleshy, sharp-lobed leaves each up to 2 centimeters long. There are sometimes smaller, unlobed leaves on the stem itself. The inflorescence is a solitary flower or loose array of two or three flowers each about 5 to 7 millimeters wide. Each flower has a hair-thin tubular throat opening into a whitish corolla. The corolla lobes each have three distinct teeth.

External links
Jepson Manual Treatment
Photo gallery

triodon
Flora of the Western United States